David Hale (born 11 November 1941) is an Australian cricketer. He played in eight first-class matches for Queensland between 1963 and 1966.

See also
 List of Queensland first-class cricketers

References

External links
 

1941 births
Living people
Australian cricketers
Queensland cricketers
Cricketers from Brisbane